Khori Alam is a village located in Kharian Tehsil, Gujrat District of Punjab, Pakistan.this village is located near Noor Jamal shamali and upper jehlem canal. As per history this village was inaugurated by Moulvi Abdul Malik
Who was Son of Molvi Muhammad Alam

Geography
It lies between Jehlum River and Chenab River.

Its nearby villages are Rajoo, Noor Jaml, Rajo Bhand, Panjan Sher Shahana, Noon, Randheer, Fatah Bhand, Amra Khurd and Amra kalan.

The book "Shahan-e-Gujjar" that is kept in the library of London was written by Maulvi Abdul Malik, who was notable person of Khori Alam.Moulvi Abdul Malik change the name of Khori Alam from Khori to Khori Alam.Abdul Malik Memorial Model School Khori.Which is Established in Khori Alam From 2005 is Named on the name of Moulvi Abdul Malik.

History
In 997 CE, Sultan Mahmud Ghaznavi, took over the Ghaznavid dynasty empire established by his father, Sultan Sebuktegin, In 1005 he conquered the Shahis in Kabul in 1005, and followed it by the conquests of Punjab region. The Delhi Sultanate and later Mughal Empire ruled the region. The Punjab region became predominantly Muslim due to missionary Sufi saints whose dargahs dot the landscape of Punjab region.

After the decline of the Mughal Empire, the Sikh invaded and occupied Gujrat District. The Muslims faced severe restrictions during the Sikh rule. During the period of British rule, Gujrat District increased in population and importance.

The predominantly Muslim population supported Muslim League and Pakistan Movement. After the independence of Pakistan in 1947, the minority Hindus and Sikhs migrated to India while the Muslims refugees from India settled down in the Mandi Bahauddin.

As this village is part of tehsil kharian, so it is also rich village. Many people settled to different foreign countries.cultural is same as the other locality.

References

Populated places in Gujrat District